François Fabius (28 July 1944 in Bourg-en-Bresse – 13 August 2006 in Paris) was a French antiquarian and equestrian.

A graduate of École du Louvre, Fabius was a managing partner of the Galerie Fabius Frères, founded by his father André Fabius and his uncle Pierre. He was a specialist on the 14th century. In 1998, his gallery was the scene of a major burglary. A hundred works of art, including animal bronzes of Barye were stolen.

Fabius was also a high-level sportsman. He was a French junior champion in horse racing in 1962 and was a member of the French riding team from 1962 to 1972. In 1972, he competed at the Summer Olympics in Munich in both the individual and team eventing competitions.

He was the brother of Prime Minister Laurent Fabius and costume designer Catherine Leterrier.

References

Décès de l'antiquaire parisien François Fabius, TSR Sport 

1942 births
2006 deaths
French antiquarians
French people of Jewish descent
Sportspeople from Bourg-en-Bresse
French male equestrians
Equestrians at the 1972 Summer Olympics
Olympic equestrians of France
20th-century antiquarians